Lesbian, gay, bisexual and transgender (LGBT) people in Ukraine face some legal challenges not experienced by non-LGBT individuals; historically, the prevailing social and political attitudes have been intolerant of LGBT people, and strong evidence suggests this attitude remains in parts of the wider society. In late 2022, parliament unanimously approved a media regulation bill that banned hate speech and incitement based on sexual orientation or gender identity. In March 2023, a parliamentary bill was introduced for civil unions; it has the support of the president and, polling suggests, of a majority of the population. Marriage is off the table for now, despite the support of the president, as marriage is defined as heterosexual by the constitution and the constitution may not be amended during wartime.

Since the fall of the Soviet Union and Ukraine's independence in 1991, the Ukrainian LGBT community has gradually become more visible and more organized politically, organizing several LGBT events in Kyiv, Odesa, Kharkiv, and Kryvyi Rih. These events were protected by Ukrainian Police. While being connected to various religious traditions (Orthodox Church of Ukraine, Ukrainian Catholic Church, Roman Catholic Church, Lutheran Church, Baptist-Evangelicals, Pentecostals, Seventh-Day Adventists and other Protestant denominations, Orthodox and Reform Judaism,  Sunni and Shia Islam, neo-paganism, etc.), the Ukrainian populace does not tend to force their beliefs on their fellow citizens—in stark contrast to Putin's Russia, which has used anti-gay rhetoric as a component of its hybrid war against Ukraine. Protests against Pride Day events were often orchestrated by the so-called Ukrainian Orthodox Church (Moscow Patriarchate) separate from the Orthodox Church of Ukraine and managed by the Kremlin (along with politicians who had proposed suppressing freedom of speech and freedom of assembly for LGBT people by enacting so-called "anti-propaganda" laws that mimicked Russian Criminal Code, though as of 2022, all such bills have been either withdrawn or rejected).

In a 2010 European study, 28% of Ukrainians polled believed that LGBT individuals should live freely and however they like. However, by 2017, a poll found that 56% of Ukrainians believed that gay and bisexual individuals should enjoy equal rights, marking a significant shift in public opinion. Attitudes are becoming more accepting, in line with worldwide trends. In 2015, the Ukrainian Parliament approved an employment anti-discrimination law covering sexual orientation and gender identity, and in 2016, Ukrainian officials simplified the transition process for transgender people and began allowing gay and bisexual men to donate blood. Ukraine's desire to join the European Union has strongly impacted its approach to LGBT rights. In 2023 the International Lesbian, Gay, Bisexual, Trans and Intersex Association ranked Ukraine 39th out of 49 European countries in terms of LGBT rights legislation, similarly to EU members Lithuania and Romania.

In the 2011 UN General Assembly declaration for LGBT rights, Ukraine was the only East Slavic country to express its support.

Legality of same-sex sexual activity
As part of the Soviet Union, the Criminal Code banned same-sex sexuality. In 1991, the law was revised so as to better protect the right to privacy and homosexuality became legal. Today, the law relates to same-sex sexual activity when it involves prostitution with persons under the legal age of consent or public conduct that is deemed to be in violation of public decency standards. The age of consent is set at 16, regardless of gender and/or sexual orientation.

Article 155 states that sexual intercourse with a person under the age of 16 committed by a person over the age of 18 shall be punishable. Additionally, according to Article 152 (since January 2019) sexual intercourse with a person under the age of 14 (regardless of his/her voluntary consent) is a rape. Since 2018, the law no longer makes reference to the concept of "sexual maturity", which existed in the former legislative framework.

Recognition of same-sex relationships

Article 51 of the Constitution specifically defines marriage as a voluntary union between a man and a woman. No legal recognition exists for same-sex marriage, nor is there any sort of more limited recognition for same-sex couples.

On 23 November 2015, the Government approved an action plan to implement the National Strategy on human rights in the period up to 2020, which include the promise to draft a bill creating registered civil partnerships for opposite-sex and same-sex couples by 2017, among others. However, in early 2018, the Ministry of Justice stated that "the development and submission to the Government of a draft law on the legalization of a registered civil partnership in Ukraine cannot be implemented" due to "numerous appeals from the regional councils, the Council of Churches and other religious organizations".

In June 2018, the Justice Ministry confirmed that currently "there is no legal grounds" for same-sex marriage and civil partnerships in Ukraine.

In July 2022, a petition in Ukraine asking for the legalisation of same-sex marriage reached over 28,000 signatures, and all petitions in Ukraine that reach over 20,000 signatures automatically start the consideration of the President of Ukraine. On 2 August 2022, in response to the petition, Zelenskyy asked the Government of Ukraine to consider legalising same-sex marriage, while also stating that there could be no action as long as the Russo-Ukrainian war continues, as the constitution cannot be changed in wartime, but that there remains a possibility of clarification of same-sex unions by the Constitutional Court of Ukraine or for legalization of same-sex partnerships. The war has spurred efforts to legalize same-sex marriage to ensure gay soldiers' partners are given the same rights and privileges afforded to those in legally recognised marriages, with activists pointing to the service of LGBT military personnel as having shifted attitudes towards LGBT people.

Adoption and parenting
Single persons who are citizens of Ukraine, regardless of sexual orientation, are allowed to adopt, but same-sex couples are explicitly banned from adoption (Clause 211 of Family Code of Ukraine). Additionally, the adopter must be at least 15 years older than the adopted child or 18 years older if adopting an adult. The law also mentions that persons "whose interests conflict with the interests of the child" may not be adopters, but whether this provision has ever been applied against gay adopters is unknown.

Additional restrictions are placed on foreign adopters. Only couples married in a registered different-sex marriage are allowed to adopt children from Ukraine.

However, lesbian couples are given more access to parenting than men, as IVF and assisted insemination treatments are legal.

Discrimination protections and hate crime laws
After having failed to gain enough votes on 5 and 9 November 2015, the Ukrainian Parliament approved an amendment to the Labor Code banning sexual orientation and gender identity discrimination at work on 12 November 2015. A similar law (that law would have barred employers from rejecting workers based on their sexual orientation) was indefinitely postponed on 14 May 2013. The law passed on 12 November 2015 was an EU requirement for Ukraine to move forward in its application for visa-free travel to the Schengen Area. Before the vote of the bill, Chairman of the Verkhovna Rada Volodymyr Groysman strongly spoke out against same-sex marriage.

There is a national hate crimes law that could be interpreted as including sexual orientation and gender identity, but that has not been decided by the courts.

In November 2016, the Ukrainian Parliament refused to back the Istanbul Convention, a European domestic violence treaty, because its references to sexual orientation and gender violated what many Ukrainian lawmakers said were basic Christian values. Following the 2022 Russian invasion of Ukraine, which resulted in a surge of reports of violence against women, Ukraine ratified the Istanbul Convention.

In December 2022, the Ukrainian Parliament unanimously passed a bill that banned hate speech and discrimination against LGBT people in mass media.

Gender identity and expression
Transsexuality is classified as a psychiatric disorder in Ukraine. Sex reassignment surgery is legal, but it is only permissible for those over the age of 25 years.

In 2011, the Ukrainian Civil Code was amended to allow transgender persons who have undergone surgery to change their name to better reflect their gender identity. In 2014, seven people had undergone sex reassignment surgery, and five people received new documentation.

Since December 2016, new identity documents are issued before surgery is conducted. This followed an August 2016 ruling which ordered changes requested by two transgender people to their passports and all other documents without requiring them to undergo surgery.  People with a child younger than 18 years old and married people can now also apply to transition. Previously, all applicants needed permission from a special commission of the Ministry of Healthcare, needed to spend 30 days in a psychiatric hospital (usually placed in the same wards with patients considered "mentally ill"), and needed to be "diagnosed with transsexuality". This is no longer required.

Military service
Under the looming threat from Russia, on Friday December 17, 2021 new legislation was enacted that requires women to register for military service, if they are deemed medically fit for military service, are between the ages of 18 and 60, and work in specific professions. In the event of a major war, this expanded reserve of women would be mobilized as part of the national reserve to serve in a broad range of military specialties. According to earlier legislation, women in certain professions were already required to register for military conscription. However, the recent revision of the law regulating Ukraine's military reserves dramatically expanded the number of professions that qualify for mandatory registration with the armed forces. Now women who are librarians, journalists, musicians, veterinarians, and psychologists, among many other professions, are required to register for military service. Oleksandra Ustinova a member of Ukraine's national parliament stated, "...in [the] current situation, the decision to educate as many people as possible to hold arms and to be ready to serve seems a good one."

All able-bodied male citizens from ages 20–27, must serve either 18 months in the navy or one year in all other services. After serving out the term of service Ukraine's conscripts become part of the inactive reserve and are eligible to be recalled for mobilization until they reach age 55 or age 60 for officers.

According to law, homosexuality is not a reason for exemption from the army. However, many young gay men try to avoid call-up to military service, as they are afraid to face unauthorized relations and other difficulties. In 2018, Viktor Pylypenko, who had served in the Donbass area for two years during the Russia–Ukraine war, became the first Ukrainian soldier to come out publicly. In 2019, several gay soldiers in the Ukrainian army participated in a photo exhibition called "We are here". In 2021, Pylypenko was trying to organize a special unit in the Ukrainian army for LGBT soldiers. In July 2021, Pylypenko stated there were 16 open LGBT soldiers in the Ukrainian army.

The 2022 Russian invasion resulted in an increased influx of and more openness regarding LGBTQ soldiers in the Ukrainian military. A growing number of soldiers disclosed their identity, believing that they could fight not just for their home country but also against existing stereotypes. The invasion also saw the spread of "unicorn insignia" which Ukrainian LGBTQ soldiers sew onto their uniforms. The unicorn was chosen due to its nature as "fantastic 'non-existent' creature", sarcastically countering claims about there being no LGBT+ individuals in the Ukrainian military.

Blood donation
In April 2016, the Ukrainian Ministry of Health enacted new regulations governing blood donation, allowing gay and bisexual men to donate blood. Previously, the Ministry of Health listed homosexuality as a "risky behaviour" for which donors could not give blood.

Society

Gay and bisexual sexual orientations and transgender identity remain taboo subjects in Ukraine. Most Ukrainians affiliated with the Orthodox or Catholic Church tend to view homosexuality and non-traditional gender roles as signs of immorality. Prior to the 25 May 2013 Kyiv pride parade, the head of the Ukrainian Orthodox Church - Kyiv Patriarchate, Patriarch Filaret, stated that people supporting LGBT rights would be cursed, and Archbishop Sviatoslav Shevchuk of the Ukrainian Greek Catholic Church denounced homosexuality as a sin tantamount to manslaughter.

Beyond the traditional religious teachings, most Ukrainians grew up with little, if any, comprehensive, fact-based public education about human sexuality in general, let alone sexual orientation and gender identity. The lack of sex education promotes the view of homosexuals as a dangerous social group and as a source of sexually transmitted diseases, especially HIV/AIDS.

During the Soviet era, non-heterosexual sexual relations were labelled as abnormal. Some remnants of the Soviet mentality, which sees sexual topics as taboo and even denies their existence, still exist today.

In 2011, there were frequent reports of harassment, even violence directed at LGBT people in Ukraine. Many LGBT people in Ukraine reported feeling the need to lie about their true sexual orientation or gender identity in order to avoid being a target for discrimination or violent harassment. Bias motivated crimes or hate crimes against people who are LGBT are frequently reported on in the international press, and while such violence is not legal in Ukraine, there is a perception by people living in Ukraine and globally that such violence is frequently tolerated by the Government. The Ukrainian police hardly ever detain attackers. The prevailing intolerance and threats of violence pressure many LGBT people to remain in the closet, especially if they are public figures who feel that their career as a politician or celebrity would end if people knew that they are part of the LGBT community.

While prevailing public attitudes are intolerant, the Ukrainian LGBT community has gradually become more visible and more organized politically since 1991. The issue of LGBT rights in Ukraine has been publicly debated much more, largely as the result of the actions of right-wing nationalists and social conservatives to classify any positive depictions of LGBT people or LGBT rights as being pornographic.

One of the major movements in opposition to LGBT rights in Ukraine is the "ex-gay" movement which believes that lesbian, gay, or bisexual sexual orientations, as well as transgender identities, can be "cured" through therapeutic or religious programs. The largest of these groups in Ukraine is Love Against Homosexuality, who believe that LGBT people are "sexual perverts" who need to be cured.

Freedom of expression and censorship
In 1999, the former President of Ukraine, Leonid Kravchuk, stated that there are more important issues than LGBT rights to discuss in Parliament and that homosexuality is caused by a mental illness or the corrupting influence of foreign films.

In 2007, the leader of the Parliamentary Committee on Human Rights called gay men "perverts" who must be stopped. Other MPs, namely Communist MP Leonid Grach, have listed homosexuality and lesbianism as evils the state must stop.

A draft law that would make it illegal to talk about homosexuality in public and in the media and to import, distribute, and broadcast video, photo, and audio products that "encourages homosexuality" (with penalties of up to five years in prison and fines for up to ₴5,000 (US$616)) was passed in first reading in the Verkhovna Rada (Ukrainian Parliament) on 2 October 2012. An estimated 20 community activists representing several organizations protested outside of the Verkhovna Rada building during the vote. On 4 October 2012, a second vote was tentatively scheduled for 16 October. This law was deemed homophobic by the LGBT community and human rights organisations and condemned by Amnesty International, the European Union, and the United Nations. The Venice Commission concluded in June 2013 that the bill was "incompatible with the European Convention on Human Rights and international human rights standards". In January 2015, the bill was removed from the agenda.

A petition was subsequently started by anti-gay groups, calling for "measures to be taken to stop the propaganda of homosexuality and for defending family values". In March 2018, Ukraine's Anti-Discrimination Ombudsperson removed the petition from the electronic petitions section. By then, the petition had received 23,000 signatures and support from various religious organisations. The Ombudsman described the petition as "anti-freedom", and deleted it due to "containing calls to restrict human rights".

Living conditions
In 1998, the first LGBT rights group was created. Our World is an LGBT community center and human rights advocacy organization. In 2008, Ukrainian LGBT rights organizations came together to create a coalition, the Union of Gay Organizations of Ukraine (Рада ЛГБТ-організацій України). The Gay Alliance of Ukraine (Гей-альянс Україна) was founded in 2009.

Pride parades and rallies

2003 to 2015
In September 2003, the first, albeit small (1 person), public pride parade was held in Kyiv.

In May 2008, Ukrainian LGBT groups were prevented from marking the International Day Against Homophobia after a last-minute intervention by authorities who told organisers that due to the likelihood of friction the events would have to be canceled. Roman Catholics, Evangelic Christians, Seventh-day Adventists, Eparchy of Christianity and Baptist and the Union of Independent Orthodox churches had asked local authorities to forbid any action by representatives of sexual minorities.

A May 2012, a Kyiv gay pride parade was cancelled by its participants because they feared for their safety. Two gay rights activists were beaten up and tear-gassed by a group of youths after pridegoers were evacuated by police escort.

On 23 May 2013, a Ukrainian court satisfied a petition by Kyiv city authorities to ban the holding of any events, other than those envisaged by the program for the celebration of Kyiv Day (in the central part of the city); in doing so it de facto banned the gay pride parade in Kyiv that was planned for 25 May. The pride event was then changed to "a private event outside of the central part of Kyiv". On this day on a narrow pathway near Pushkin Park and Shuliavska metro station, about 50 people gathered and marched. Among them, at least 10 were from Munich (Germany), including Vice Mayor Hep Monatzeder, and some were from Sweden. They marched under the protection of 1,500 policemen, 13 of the about 100 anti-gay protesters were arrested and no physical violence occurred. After one hour, the protesters who took part in the parade were evacuated from the area. In an attempt to avoid revenge attacks, they then changed their clothes and switched modes of transport multiple times.

A procession organised by gay rights activists took place in central Kyiv on 11 January 2014; amidst the Euromaidan-protests.

The Kyiv gay pride parade was again cancelled on 5 July 2014 after the police failed to guarantee its protection. It would have been a small, closed march several kilometers outside Kyiv. The Love Against Homosexuality movement demanded its cancellation. On 7 July 2014, Mayor of Kyiv Vitali Klitschko had asked to cancel the pride, "I think that currently, when battle actions take place and many people die, holding entertainment events does not match the situation existing. And I am urging all these people not to do this. I think that this will be wrong amid these circumstances". The "battle actions" Klitschko referred to was the post-ceasefire government offensive of the War in Donbass.

2015 to now

On 6 June 2015, Ukraine's second pride parade was held in Kyiv. The march was finished in less than half an hour. The number of police protection far outnumbered the pride participants. The venue for the march was only disclosed to the march's participants that had registered on its website. During the march, five policemen were injured in scuffles after unidentified people had attacked the rally with smoke bombs and stones. One police officer was admitted to intensive care. 25 anti-gay activists were arrested. Members of Parliament Svitlana Zalishchuk and Serhiy Leshchenko attended the march along with the Swedish Ambassador to Ukraine, Andreas von Beckerath, and other foreign diplomats. The organizers urged the pride participants to disperse in small groups and not to use the Kyiv Metro. On 4 June 2015, Kyiv Mayor Vitali Klitschko had, as in the previous year, asked to cancel the pride citing "danger of provocations". On the other hand, Ukrainian President Petro Poroshenko stated on 5 June 2015 that there was no reason to prevent the march.

On 12 June 2016, Ukraine's third pride parade, dubbed the Equality March, was held in Kyiv without incidents. The march of 1,500 people lasted about half an hour and was guarded by more than 5,500 police officers and 1,200 members of the National Guard. 57 people were detained for aggressive behavior.

On 13 August 2016, an LGBT Equality March was held in Odessa. The march of 50 people lasted about half an hour and was guarded by more than 700 police officers. Twenty men, who were trying to break through to the event, were detained.

In May 2017, LGBT activists organised a rally in the city of Kharkiv. Thirty people attacked the participants and police officers, injuring two.

On 18 June 2017, Kyiv's fourth pride parade, again dubbed Equality March, was held in the city without major incidents with 6 people detained for trying to breach the security cordon.

On 17 June 2018, Kyiv's fifth pride parade was held in the city centre. It lasted less than one hour and was, according to Kyiv police attended by 3,500 people, while the organizers said there were at least 5,000 participants. No serious incidents occurred during the march. Clashes did break out when 150 far-right protesters who tried to block off the route were dispersed by riot police. 57 protesters were detained.

In June 2019, an estimated 8,000 people marched at the Kyiv Pride parade, among them politicians and foreign diplomats. The event was peaceful. Police foiled a plot to throw condoms filled with human excrement at marchers. President Volodymyr Zelensky, who took office in May 2019, urged the police to prevent violence and safeguard the safety of the participants.

In August 2019, about 300 people took part in the LGBT Equality March in Odessa. A number of diplomatic missions took part, as well as guests from Canada, Germany, the United States and other countries. Some small clashes were reported. The marchers were protected by 500 police officers, who arrested three people for minor hooliganism.

In September 2019, an estimated 2,000 people participated in Kharkiv's first pride march. The march went forward despite Mayor Hennadiy Kernes threatening to file legal action against the organizers. At the end of the march, clashes between the police and anti-pride march right-wing demonstrators saw two police agents being treated for pepper spray-related injuries. After the march ended, far-right counterdemonstrators gathered in Shevchenko park hoping to attack LGBT activists attempting to leave on foot. One march participant had to be rescued by a press photographer.

On 30 August 2020, an LGBT Equality March in Odessa ended in a fight between members of the LGBT community and opponents of the march. Sixteen people were detained and two police officers were injured. A 13 September 2020 "AutoPride rally" in Kharkiv passed without incidents. In Zaporizhzhia a pride parade was held on 20 September 2020 on the city's Festival Square; although pride goers were harassed by anti-LGBT activists, no injuries were reported. There were twice as many pride opponents as there were pride goers (reportedly 500 people).

On 22 May 2021 a Trans-March, organised by Insight and partners KyivPride and Cohort, took place in Kyiv. The march was attended by about 150 participants, protected by 400 police officers and there was a counter-demonstration with approximately 200 opponents. During the march, several people tried to attack the marchers, but the police quickly prevented that.

On 29 August 2021 violent clashes broke out between police and the far-right nationalist group Tradition and Order during an LGBT Equality March in Odessa. 29 law enforcement officers were injured, mostly from reactions to tear gas, and 51 members of Tradition and Order were arrested.

On 12 September 2021 an LGBT Equality March, organised by KharkivPride, took place in Kharkiv. According to KharkivPride, up to 3,000 people took part in the march.

The KyivPride-2021 Equality March took place in Kyiv on 19 September 2021 with between 5,000 and 7,000 participants. Several hundred activists opposing the march held their own rally, no clashes between the two sides took place. The KyivPride-2021 Equality March was attended by the Ambassador of Sweden to Ukraine Tobias Thyberg, MP of the Voice faction Inna Sovsun and deputy of the Kyiv City Council from the Servant of the People party faction Yevhenia Kuleba.

Due to the 2022 Russian invasion of Ukraine causing many Ukrainians to flee the country and Russian aerial bombing campaigns, KyivPride was held in Warsaw in a combined event with the city's Equality Parade on June 25. In addition to LGBT rights, the march also focused on supporting Ukraine and calling for peace.

Attacks on the LGBT community
On 22 June 2012, a man approached LGBT activist Taras Karasiichuk saying, "Are you a fag?" and then kicked him in the head and jaw. Human Rights Watch said authorities should treat the incident as a hate crime.

An Amnesty International expert on Ukraine stated in 2013 that "people have been beaten and in one case murdered because of their real or perceived sexual orientation or gender identity. Most of these crimes have not been properly investigated and have gone unpunished."

On 6 July 2014, a group of 15-20 neo-Nazis mounted an attack against the gay club "Pomada" (Lipstick) in Kyiv. The attackers wore camouflage and balaclava (ski masks) and threw a smoke grenade and firecrackers.

On 29 October 2014, Kyiv's oldest movie theater, Zhovten, caught fire when a smoke grenade was thrown into it during the screening of the French film Summer Nights, which was shown as part of an LGBT program at the Molodist Film Festival. None of the roughly hundred people attending were injured. Police arrested two suspects, one of whom said that the intent was not to burn the building down, but to make a protest against films with an LGBT theme.

Oleksandr Zinchenko, an Our World representative, stated on 3 June 2015 that 40 hate crimes had been committed against LGBT people in 2014 and that about 10 such crimes had already happened in 2015.

Persecution in Russian-occupied Donbas
Gay people are being actively persecuted in the separatist-controlled areas of Donbas.

Lesbian, gay, bisexual, and transgender individuals have complained about an increase of attacks in the self-proclaimed Donetsk People's Republic in Eastern Ukraine. On 8 June 2014, ten armed people attacked the gay club Babylon in the city of Donetsk. They fired blank cartridges into the air for intimidation and declared that there should not be gay clubs in the city, after which they robbed the visitors. In 2015, the Deputy Minister for Political Affairs of the Donetsk People's Republic stated: "A culture of homosexuality is spreading… This is why we must kill anyone who is involved in this." Many volunteers who took in refugees from territories controlled by the Donetsk People's Republic refused to host LGBT people.

In July 2015, the head of the Donetsk People's Republic, Alexander Zakharchenko, said he respected Ukraine's far-right party Right Sector "when they beat up the gays in Kyiv and when they tried to depose Poroshenko".

Public opinion
In a 2007 country-wide survey by the Institute of Sociology, 16.7% disagreed strongly and 17.6% disagreed with the following statement: Gay men and lesbians should be free to live their own life as they wish. Only 30.2% agreed strongly and agreed with the statement. That was the lowest rating of agreed strongly and agreed with the statement of 24 countries investigated.

In a December 2007 survey by Angus Reid Global Monitor, 81.3% of Ukrainians polled said that homosexual relations were "never acceptable", 13% answered "sometimes acceptable" and 5.7% "acceptable". Of all the behaviors listed, homosexuality was viewed as the third worst after shoplifting and drunk driving. Notably, more people viewed this as never acceptable than adultery (61.5% never, 29.3% sometimes), traffic rule violation (70.2% never, 25.6% sometimes), pollution (73.3% never, 22.4% sometimes), tax evasion (48.5% never, 37.5% sometimes), deception for the sake of profit (48.3% never, 41.6% sometimes), as well as a list of other things including abortion, premarital sex, complaining to authorities about a friend who has stolen something, etc.

In another Angus Reid Global Monitor survey, this one in June 2007, on a long list of possible social reforms in the country, legalization of same-sex marriage only received 4.7% of the vote, the lowest by far (the next lowest being light drugs, at 7.1%).

A December 2010 Gorshenin Institute poll stated that the "Ukrainian attitude to sexual minorities" was "entirely negative" for 57.5%, "rather negative" for 14.5%, "rather positive" for 10% and "quite positive" for 3%.

A May 2013 poll by GfK Ukraine found that 4.6% of respondents were in favour of same-sex marriage and 16% supported other forms of recognition, while 79.4% were opposed to any form of recognition.

A summer 2015 survey by the British Council revealed that one in five of Ukrainian youth would be uncomfortable with having lesbian and gay people as friends.

According to a 2015–16 survey by the Pew Research Center, 86% of Ukrainian respondents believed that homosexuality should not be accepted by society.

In May 2016 in a survey by Nash Svit Center, conducted by the Kyiv International Institute of Sociology, only 3,3% of respondents claimed to be positive about LGBT people in general, while 60,4% were negative and 30,7% were indifferent. When asked about equal rights, 33,4% agreed that LGBT members should have the same rights as others, while 45,2% disagreed and 21,3% could not or did not want to answer.

On 25 September 2016, European scientific studies detected that Ukrainians displayed higher levels of homophobia than Albanians and Italians, confirming the central role of cultural differences in homophobic attitudes.

A Pew Research Center poll published in May 2017 suggested that 9% of Ukrainians were in favor of same-sex marriage, while 85% opposed it. According to the poll, younger people were more likely than their elders to favor legal same-sex marriage (11% vs. 7%).

According to a 2017 poll carried out by ILGA, 56% of Ukrainians agreed that gay, lesbian and bisexual people should enjoy the same rights as straight people, while 21% disagreed. Additionally, 59% agreed that they should be protected from workplace discrimination. 20% of Ukrainians, however, said that people who are in same-sex relationships should be charged as criminals, while 55% disagreed. As for transgender people, 60% agreed that they should have the same rights, 58% believed they should be protected from employment discrimination and a plurality of 43% believed they should be allowed to change their legal gender.

In May 2022 in a survey by Nash Svit Center, also conducted by the Kyiv International Institute of Sociology, 12.8% of respondents claimed to be positive about LGBT people in general, while 38.2% were negative and 44.8% indifferent. When asked about equal rights, 63.7% agreed that LGBT members should have equal rights, while 25.9% disagreed and 10.4% could not or did not want to answer. Nash Svit Center believes that acceptance of LGBT people in Ukraine has "Dramatically improved" compared to results from their similar survey from 2016. It might have been a result of Russian invasion, carried out under the slogans of defending traditional values and fighting gay parades.

As in many post-Soviet countries, the male prisons with their norms that had emerged as instruments of self-governance is one of the reasons for anti-gay attitudes due to the high number of people who went through the penitentiary system in the Soviet Union.

Summary table

See also

 LGBT rights in Europe
 Human rights in Ukraine
 Sexual orientation and military service

Notes

References

Further reading

External links

 
 
 
 
 

 
Law of Ukraine
LGBT in Ukraine